Martin Furlong (born 14 September 1946 in Tullamore, County Offaly) is an Irish former Gaelic footballer who played for his local club Tullamore and was the first-choice goalkeeper at senior level on the Offaly county team from 1966 until 1985. Furlong is the only Offaly player to have won three All-Ireland SFC medals in 1971, 1972 and 1982. He also won an All-Ireland Minor Football Championship in 1964. He won the Texaco Footballer of the Year in 1982 after Offaly's All-Ireland SFC win. 

In 1989 Martin moved from Clonminch, Tullamore to America following the request of him older brother Tom, to assist him in running his bar. Martin continues to live in New York, two of his sons live in America, one son and his only daughter returned to Ireland.

He was interviewed from his American base for the documentary Players of the Faithful.

In May 2020, the Irish Independent named Furlong as one of the "dozens of brilliant players" who narrowly missed selection for its "Top 20 footballers in Ireland over the past 50 years".

References

1946 births
Living people
All Stars Awards winners (football)
Gaelic football goalkeepers
Leinster inter-provincial Gaelic footballers
Offaly inter-county Gaelic footballers
People from Tullamore, County Offaly
Tullamore Gaelic footballers
Winners of three All-Ireland medals (Gaelic football)